Joshua Glover was a fugitive slave who escaped to Canada in the 1850s.
Originally from the state of Missouri, Glover escaped slavery in 1852 and sought asylum in Racine, Wisconsin. Two years later, upon learning his whereabouts, slave owner Benammi Stone Garland attempted to use the Fugitive Slave Act to recapture him. Glover was arrested and taken to a Milwaukee jail. Word spread of his capture, leading prominent abolitionists like Sherman Booth to galvanize popular support to free him. On March 18, 1854, Glover was broken out of prison by a crowd of more than 500 people, and was secretly taken back to Racine through the Underground Railroad.

From here he traveled by boat to Canada, where he spent the rest of his life. He settled outside the city of Toronto, in present day Etobicoke.
The tale of Glover's daring escape spread in newspapers across the north, making him a local folk-hero. Historians today view his story from the perspective of the final decade of slavery in America, amid rising tensions between the north and south in the years leading to the outbreak of the American Civil War in 1861. The rescue of Glover and the federal government's subsequent attempt to prosecute Booth helped to galvanize the abolitionist movement in the state, and the event is seen as an important step in strengthening and legitimizing the northern abolitionist movement as a popular political force. After Glover's escape, the state of Wisconsin would go against the federal government and declare the Fugitive Slave Act unconstitutional, the only state to do so. It was in this context, some nine days after Glover's escape, that the Republican Party was founded, in Ripon, Wisconsin.

Early Life 
Little is known about Joshua Glover's early life. He was born into slavery in Missouri in the early 19th century and was sold at auction more than once across the state.

Records show that on New Year's Day, 1850, he was sold at St. Louis Courthouse Auction to Benammi Stone Garland, a local estate owner. At the auction, records show that Glover was publicly stripped and examined. The same day, Glover was taken to work on Garland's 300-acre Prairie House Farm estate. He became a foreman, working outside the fields with a group of five other slaves. Reporting directly to Garland, Glover worked outside the fields, caring for farm animals, logging and clearing land. This knowledge of the land likely helped Glover escape in May of 1852. As a fugitive slave, he crossed the Mississippi River and headed north to the free states. 

By summer, some 500 kilometers later, he reached Racine, Wisconsin, a city in a free state. Beginning his life as a free man, he found work and housing at Sinclair and Rice Sawmill, a local lumber yard and sawmill owned by Duncan Sinclair, a local businessman. With room and board, there, he took the last name "Glover" and for the next two years took on what would seem a regular life, working as a laborer and skilled carpenter.

Recapture 
Having been unable to track him down, Garland put an ad in a local newspaper offering two hundred dollars for Glover's return, who he deemed his property. 

Two years after his escape, Glover is said to have been betrayed by his friend Nathan Turner, also a former slave, who gave up his location to Garland. Garland led a group of slave catchers to Wisconsin, where he obtained a federal warrant for Glover's arrest under the Fugitive Slave Act of 1850. This act enabled federal marshals to pursue fugitive slaves anywhere in the United States, arrest them and return them to their slavers. 

On March 10, 1854, Garland's group, aided by St. Louis Police, ambushed and arrested Glover. Glover had been taken by surprise. At the time of the arrest, he was in his cabin (rented to him by Sinclair) playing cards with two friends, one of whom was Nathan Turner. Hearing a knock at the door, Glover told his friends not to open the door until he knew who it was. He was suspicious as rumors had spread of slavers being in town and that the day before, marshals had come looking for him. An expedient Turner then unlocked the door, and the party came bursting in. Severely outnumbered, Glover put up a fight, but was ultimately overwhelmed and badly beaten. Glover was hit repeatedly with a club to the face by St. Louis Police Deputy Marshal John Kearney, and the butt of a gun. Bleeding from the head, a half-conscious Glover was thrown in a wagon and taken to Milwaukee jail, where a sympathetic jailer is said to have treated Glover's wounds, possibly saving his life. He was to be held here and brought back to St. Louis the next morning. Garland is said to have given Turner $100, half of the original advertised amount, for his help in the capture.

Prison break and escape 
Word of Glover's arrest and the injuries he had sustained spread across the state, sparking outrage. Residents gathered in the town square, and local abolitionists mobilized popular support and contacted newspapers. Money was raised to send a delegation by boat to Milwaukee to ensure Glover got a fair trial. Critical in this was the leadership of Sherman Booth, editor of the Wisconsin Free Democrat  and a prominent abolitionist. Booth appealed to a town judge, and was able to obtain the warrant for Garland's arrest and the marshals involved in Glover’s capture. Money was raised and a delegation of over one hundred representatives traveled by boat to Milwaukee. They arrived that same day, and joined a crowd of more than 500 people who had gathered outside the courthouse demanding a fair and expediated trial. With their demands unmet, Booth is said to have spurred the crowd into action, taking matters into their own hands. Using pickaxes from a nearby construction site, and as pieces of lumber as a make-shift battering ram, the crowd broke through the jail walls, freeing Glover. He was escorted to a wagon, and was helped to escape town quickly. Garland's posse pursued Glover across Wisconsin for weeks. “Imagine a crowd of four to six thousand persons smashing in the jail, releasing the negro and then running as they could the distance of a mile, and every man in town running too—windows open, handkerchiefs waving…"

Racine Daily Morning Advocate, March 12, 1854.Still recovering from his injuries, Glover was hidden and supported by locals throughout Racine County, at great risk to themselves. Some of these include John Messenger, C.C. Olin, Alfred Payne, Richard Ela, Joel Cooper and Moses Tichenor. There efforts, part of the Underground Railroad, were crucial in protecting Glover and preventing his recapture. Glover ended up at Dutton and Raymond Warehouse on Racine’s harbor waiting for an available ship to Canada. An staunch abolitionist, A.P Dutton, knew which ships were coming in and out of the harbor, and helped Glover escape to freedom. Dutton would go on to claim that over one hundred fugitive slaves were able to escape via the harbor.

Life in Canada 

Glover likely left Racine hidden in a ship in early April 1854, heading for Upper Canada. On April 19, 1854 his name reappears on record in Etobicoke, Ontario, in the account book of Thomas Montgomery, a local businessman. It reads, "Joshua Glover the Negro to cash 15/-."; this seems to be a charge of 15 shillings, and advance against his future wages.    "But just think of it, a man to have to flee from the land of the free, to the realms of Monarchical and Aristocratic Britain, to enjoy even personal freedom." 
The Ozaukee Co. Times, printed in the Provincial Freeman.Little is known of Glover's life in Canada as a free man, but it was likely a difficult one. He continued to work for Montgomery into his early 60s, managing and working his land. Glover rented from Montgomery, living in Lampton Mills, before buying his own property, becoming one of the first black homeowners in the area. He was seen as active member of the community and is recorded as having attended the fall fair of Annual Agricultural Association of Upper Canada in 1858. He married twice, both times to Irish women. 

In 1884, Glover was accused of having stabbed a white man, and was subsequently sentenced to three months in prison. Members of the community had come to his defense, including (then deceased) Montgomery Sr.'s son, and his sentenced was reduced to "wounding without intent".

In January of 1888, Glover was admitted to the York County Industrial Home for the poor and destitute in New Market. To pay for his care and lodging there, he was required to work in the shelter's garden fields. He died six months after, and his body was mistakenly donated due to an "administrative error" to the Toronto School of Medicine, a precursor to the University of Toronto. Montgomery's family received a telegram notifying them of Glover's death on 4 June 1888. They attempted to find and recover his body at the medical school, to no avail. 

Joshua Glover was buried at St. James Cemetery, in the University of Toronto's medical research memorial.

See also 

 Jerry Rescue
 Ableman v. Booth

Notes 
 1.A newspaper account of the escape; historians estimate there were likely around five hundred people in the crowd, given the population of Wisconsin at the time, eye-witness accounts and other indicators.

References

Further reading 

 Jackson, Ruby West and Walter T. McDonald. "Finding Freedom: The Untold Story of Joshua Glover, Runaway Slave". Wisconsin Magazine of History, vol. 90, no. 3 (Spring 2007), pp.48–52.

External links 

 Joshua Glover's 1854 Journey on the Underground Railroad: As Told by One of His Conductors, Chauncy C. Olin
 Freedom Heights (A Song for Joshua Glover).
 PBS Wisconsin Education Resource

1810s births
1888 deaths
Fugitive American slaves
African-American history of Wisconsin
Pro-fugitive slave riots and civil disorder in the United States
Fugitive American slaves that reached Canada